The La Liga Awards, previously known as the LFP Awards, were presented annually by the Liga de Fútbol Profesional (LFP) to the best players and coach in La Liga, the first division of association football in Spain. Established in the 2008–09 season, they were the first official awards in the history of the Spanish competition. La Liga's best coach and player in each position—goalkeeper, defender, midfielder, and forward—were chosen based on a voting by the captain and vice-captains of each club, while the best player overall was determined via statistical analysis.

Since the La Liga Awards' creation, Barcelona players have won 32 honours in the six main categories, almost triple the number of any other club. Barcelona's forward Lionel Messi has been named La Liga's best player for six times and La Liga's best forward for seven times, both all-time records. Across all positions, the other outstanding individuals are Barcelona midfielder Andrés Iniesta with five wins, Barcelona coach Pep Guardiola with four wins, Real Madrid defender Sergio Ramos with four wins, and goalkeepers Iker Casillas of Real Madrid and Víctor Valdés of Barcelona with two wins each.

The majority of the awards were discontinued after the 2015–16 season.

Main categories

Winners

Wins by individual

Wins by club

Wins by individual

Wins by club

Wins by individual

Wins by club

Wins by individual

Wins by club

Wins by individual

Wins by club

Wins by individual

Wins by club

Additional categories

Other La Liga honours
The following awards were presented once:

Player of the season

Best African player

Team of the season

Player and manager of the month

See also
Don Balón Award
Miguel Muñoz Trophy
Trofeo Alfredo Di Stéfano
Trofeo Aldo Rovira
Trofeo EFE
Ricardo Zamora Trophy
Pichichi Trophy
Zarra Trophy

References
Notes

Citations

La Liga trophies and awards
Spanish football trophies and awards
2009 establishments in Spain
Awards established in 2009
Annual events in Spain